Lethe serbonis , the brown forester, is a species of Satyrinae butterfly found in the  Indomalayan realm (Bhutan, Sikkim, Assam, Arunachal Pradesh, Burma,  West China)

References

serbonis
Butterflies of Asia